Venussian Tabutasco Is a 2004 experimental film produced, written and directed by Daryush Shokof. The title is made up by Shokof, similar to many other titles of works. It is an original conceptual film about the residents of different stories in a building viewed completely through a glass elevator. Shot on location in Berlin, Germany in 2004, the film is 60 minutes long and was initially supposed to be shot "uncut" and digitally. The music score for the film is composed by Tom Dokoupil. The film was screened in BAPFF film festival in Berlin, Germany, in 2005 and at the New York International Independent Film Festival on March 4, 2007.

Plot
The stories of the people living in this building are told as camera tilts constantly up and down the 5 story building while we see the actions through the glass elevator of the building. The scenes are homages from Tati, to Buster Keaton, Hitchcock, to Buñuel, and finally ends with Tarantino's suitcase effect. There is a Gangster story on the fifth floor, in which a thief has stolen a suitcase from the gangsters who now know where he lives. The thief's girlfriend falls in love with the boy in the third floor who is actually an undecided homosexual who in turn falls in love with the man on the second floor, and together they beat up the boxer who helps the gangsters on the first floor. Eventually their lives interrelate to one another as they are seen appearing and disappearing in and out of the elevator. As the film continues, new stories unfold connecting the lives of the residents further and more hilariously to one another.

Cast
 Narges Rashidi
 Daryush Shokof
 Dirk Mayer
 Azin Feizabadi
 Victoria Simon
  Tjadke Bellows
 Tuncay Gary
 Joachim Paul Assböck
 Walter Kalk
 Uwagboe Ryall
 Christian Seeger

Production design
 Daryush Shokof

External links

Daryush Shokof Official site

BAPFF Film Festival Germany
New York International Independent Film Festival

References

2004 films
German independent films
2000s avant-garde and experimental films
English-language German films
2000s English-language films
Films directed by Daryush Shokof
2000s German films